Timofey Nikolayevich Granovsky (9 March 1813 – 4 October 1855) was a founder of mediaeval studies in the Russian Empire.

Granovsky was born in Oryol, Russia. He studied at the universities of Moscow and Berlin, where he was profoundly influenced by Hegelian ideas of Leopold von Ranke and Friedrich Carl von Savigny. He felt that the Western history was superior to that of his own country and became the first Russian to deliver courses on the medieval history of Western Europe (1839). Due to the strict censorship of the period, Granovsky assumed that lecturing provided a surer way of disseminating Western ideals in Russia than writing. His major printed work was his doctoral dissertation of 1849, Abbat Sugerii (Abbot Suger), in which he "portrayed the great abbot as the architect of royal centralization." His master's thesis of 1845, "Volin, Yumsberg, i Vineta" (Wolin, Jomsborg, and Vineta), attempted to disprove the historicity of Vineta and was very controversial, offending the Slavophiles.

His readings in the Moscow University were immensely popular and brought him in touch with other Westernizers. One of these, Alexander Herzen, described Granovsky's lectures as "a draught of freedom in Nicholas I's Russia".

Fyodor Dostoyevsky's novel The Possessed features a character, Stepan Trofimovich Verkhovensky, that is partly based on Granovsky. According to Cole, this "liberal who unwittingly inspired a generation of nihilists is unfair to Granovsky but is nevertheless another tribute to his importance as an inspiring teacher and a man of his age."

References

External links

Biography and assessment (from Brockhaus and Efron) by Sir Paul Vinogradoff.

1813 births
1855 deaths
People from Oryol
People from Orlovsky Uyezd (Oryol Governorate)
Russian nobility
19th-century historians from the Russian Empire
Russian medievalists
Liberals from the Russian Empire